Little Arrows is the third studio album released by Jimmy Osmond in 1975. Two singles, "Little Arrows" and "I'm Gonna Knock on Your Door", were released from the album.

Track listing

Personnel
Don Costa, Thomas Oliver - arrangements
Humberto Gatica, Ed Green - engineers

References
http://osmondmania.com/Discography2/Album_Pages/LittleArrows.html

1975 albums
Jimmy Osmond albums
Albums arranged by Don Costa
Albums produced by Mike Curb
Albums produced by Don Costa
Albums produced by Michael Lloyd (music producer)
MGM Records albums